Campeloma decisum, common name the pointed campeloma, is a species of freshwater snail with an operculum, an aquatic gastropod mollusk in the family Viviparidae.

Description

C. decisum can be found in freshwater ecosystems throughout eastern North America. The species is capable of both sexual reproduction and parthenogenesis.  They typically reproduce when they're a year old, and live approximately three years. The species is  sexually dimorphic.

Ecology
Parasites of Campeloma decisum include trematode Aspidogaster conchicola.

References

External links

Viviparidae
Molluscs of North America
Fauna of the Great Lakes region (North America)